John "Jack" Borden Newton (born 13 August 1942, Winnipeg, Manitoba) is a Canadian astronomer, best known for his publications and images in amateur astrophotography.

Astrophotography

Newton was 13 years old when he took his first astrophotograph, of the planet Saturn. He pioneered "cold camera" astrophotography, chilling a film camera with dry ice, allowing for substantially longer exposures on film to get detail out of very dim and distant celestial objects.

In 1991 Newton became the first amateur astrophotographer to make full color CCD images of celestial objects using a Santa Barbara Instruments Group ST-4 camera, making a full color CCD image of M57, the "Ring Nebula" and M27, the "Dumbbell Nebula". He took three separate black and white images, each taken with a separate filter in red, blue, and green, which were later combined in software that was being developed for amateur astrophotography by Richard Berry, then editor of Astronomy magazine. Berry published the first combined color CCD image of M27 as his magazine's cover in February, 1992.

Books
Newton has published six books on amateur astronomy and astrophotography. His first book, Astrophotography: From Film to Infinity, was published by Astronomical Endeavors Publishing Company (Buffalo, NY) in 1974.

Deep Sky Objects was published in 1977 by GALL Publications (Toronto, Ontario, Canada) ISBN 0-88904-081-8.

He has had two books published by Cambridge University Press: the Cambridge Deep-Sky Album in 1983, and the Guide to Amateur Astronomy in 1995, .

Awards and recognition

He received the Queen Elizabeth II Silver Jubilee Medal in 1977 for his contributions to science. He is the Honorary Patron of the Cotswold Astronomical Society.

In 2005, Carolyn S. Shoemaker and David H. Levy named an asteroid, 30840 Jackalice = 1991 GC2, in honor of Newton's astrophotographic accomplishments and of the work in astronomy outreach by Jack and Alice Newton.

Newton was elected by membership of the Astronomical Society of the Pacific to a three terms of office on its board of trustees. (1991-1997, 2006–7) He led the launch of Project Astro which aims to assist astronomers and teachers in the classroom. Newton was the recipient of the Amateur Achievement Award of Astronomical Society of the Pacific in 1988 for his work in astrophotography. This award "recognizes significant observational or technological contributions to astronomy or amateur astronomy by an individual not employed in the field of astronomy in a professional capacity".

Jack has led solar eclipse expeditions to Oaxaca (Mexico), Baker Lake, Nunavut, Bransk, Baja California, and Indonesia. He also led a group to Peru to view Halley's Comet.

He was a long-time member of the Puckett Observatory World Supernova Search Team, and as of the date of disbandment of the Team in October 2019, was credited with one pre-discovery, over 210 discoveries and co-discoveries, and one cataclysmic variable discovery in June 2010.

Newton helped establish the astronomy program at the Lester B. Pearson College of the Pacific (UWC), in British Columbia, Canada, to which he donated his 25-inch Newtonian telescope. The Newtons served several terms as honorary patrons of the college.

Newton was the President of the Royal Astronomical Society of Canada from 1975 to 1976.

He was elected as a Life Member in 1978. His photos appear on the cover of the 2007 Observer’s Handbook and in the RASC calendar. The Victoria Center created a "Newton/Ball" (Jack Newton/George Ball) award which it gives annually as a service award. He received the Royal Astronomical Society of Canada's Ken Chilton prize in 1978. He was the Royal Astronomical Society of Canada's Chant Medal recipient for 1989.

Current work
His photography and writing has frequently been published in Astronomy magazine. His photos have been published in Skynews (Canada) and in Sterne und Weltraum, the journal of the German Max Planck Institute.

In 2007 one of his solar images was used for the lead-in to the science section in Life: Platinum Edition Anniversary Collection—70 Years of Extraordinary Photography (ISBN 1-933405-17-1)

His solar images appeared in National Geographic's 2004 special edition entitled Exploring Space - the universe in pictures, Time Inc.'s Life - the Year in Pictures (2003 & 2004), and in Sky & Telescopes 2004  Beautiful Universe issue.

His astrophotographs have appeared in the Audubon Field Guide to the Night Sky, and in Nightwatch, an astronomy book by Terence Dickinson, with whom Newton co-wrote Splendors of the Universe: A Practical Guide to Photographing the Night Sky, 1997, . Jack has been named as an Explore Alliance Ambassador for Explore Scientific, dedicated to nurturing and sustaining the community. He also is active in supporting the goals of the International dark-sky movement.

The Newtons own and operate an astronomy-themed bed and breakfast, the Observatory B&B, near Osoyoos in the Okanagan Valley of British Columbia. Guests get evening and morning astronomy "tours" through their roof-top telescope included in their stays. Jack and Alice are co-founders of the Arizona Sky Village, an astronomy and nature-oriented community in Portal, Arizona.

References

External links
 

1942 births
Living people
Amateur astronomers
20th-century Canadian astronomers